Son Chang-il (Hangul: 손창일, January 1, 1982), better known by his stage name Illson (stylized as ILLSON) and formerly as Double K (Hangul: 더블 케이), is a South Korean rapper. He was the winning judge/producer on the first season of Show Me the Money before making a second appearance as a contestant in the sixth season. He released his first album, Positive Mind, on October 28, 2004.

Discography

Studio albums

Special albums

Extended plays

Charted singles

References

1982 births
Living people
South Korean male rappers
South Korean hip hop singers
21st-century South Korean male  singers